Huéscar is a municipality of the province of Granada, Spain.

History
When the Iberian Peninsula was conquered by Rome, Osca was a town of the Turdetani, and incorporated into the Roman province of Hispania Baetica. However, purportedly ancient coins from this town are not genuine.

On November 11, 1809, during the Napoleonic wars over Spain, wherein Denmark supported the French Empire the City Council of Huéscar fancifully decided to declare its own war on Denmark.  This event was swiftly forgotten until it was rediscovered by a local historian in 1981.  This led to a symbolic peace ceremony on 11 November 1981, wherein the city mayor and the Ambassador of Denmark publicly shook hands.  No such war was conducted during the intervening 172 years and no conflict or injury occurred.

Main sights
The main landmark is the Collegiate Church of St. Mary the Major, designed by Diego de Siloé in the 16th century.

Sister cities
Huéscar is twinned with:
  Kolding, Denmark, since 1982

See also
Duke of Huéscar

References

Municipalities in the Province of Granada
Roman sites in Spain